Erattai Manithan is a 1982 Indian Tamil-language film,  directed by K. Shankar and produced by S. Aadhilakshmi. The film stars S. S. Rajendran (who is also credited for film's script), Jai Ganesh, Latha, Sumithra, Bhavani and V. K. Ramasamy.

Plot
Durai (S. S. Rajendran) is honest, straightforward and lives by a strict moral code. His only family is his younger sister Vani (Sumithra) and he works as a manager for Thangavelu's (V. K. Ramasamy) company. Thangavelu's wife Mangalam (Manorama) and daughter Kannamma (Latha) constantly clash with Durai's stodgy attitude but Thangavelu appreciates him. Thangavelu's family watches a play and see Durai as an actor in it. Mangalam and Kannamma point out Durai's hypocrisy and duplicity in pursuing acting when he has such strict expectations of everyone else. When Thangavelu confronts him, Durai lies and invents a younger twin brother, Raja, that is an actor and singer. Thangavelu and his family fall for his act and hire Raja to be Kannamma's music teacher. In the meantime, Vani falls in love with Chandran (Jai Ganesh), Durai's costar in his plays and also Thangavelu's nephew. Unknown to Vani, he's a cad that uses the ruse of producing films to get closer to various women. Kannamma falls in love with Raja who also loves her but is reticent due to his lies and her continuing dislike of Durai. Matters are further complicated when another of Durai's costars, Bhavani (Bhavani), learns the truth and blackmails him. Durai confesses all to Thangavelu's family and is forgiven but now has to face the ire of Chandran and Bhavani.

Cast

S. S. Rajendran as Durai
Jai Ganesh as Chandran
Latha as Kannamma
Sumithra as Vani
Bhavani as Bhavani
V. K. Ramasamy as Thangavelu
Manorama as Mangalam
Suruli Rajan as Sokkan
Gandhimathi as Ding Dong Ramamani
D. V. Narayanaswamy
Preetha
A. K. Sundar
P. P. Subbiah
Karikol Raj
K. R. Seetharaman
Rajavelu
Jayadev

Soundtrack 
The soundtrack was composed by M. S. Viswanathan.

Reception

References

External links
 
 

1982 films
1980s Tamil-language films
Films scored by M. S. Viswanathan
Films directed by K. Shankar